Neu-Hohenschönhausen is a German locality (Ortsteil) in the borough (Bezirk) of Lichtenberg, Berlin. Until 2001 it was part of the former Hohenschönhausen borough.

History
The locality, still inhabited in the 19th century, hadn't a different name from Alt-Hohenschönhausen as part of it. The designation was used from the 1960s for this local part, to distinguish it from the old town.

Geography

Position
Neu-Hohenschönhausen is located in the north-eastern part of Berlin. It borders with the localities of Malchow, Falkenberg, Wartenberg, Alt-Hohenschönhausen, Weißensee, Stadtrandsiedlung Malchow (both in Pankow district) and Marzahn (in Marzahn-Hellersdorf district).

Subdivision
The locality is divided into 4 zones (Ortsgebiete):
Neubaugebiet Krummer Pfuhl
Neubaugebiet Vincent-van-Gogh-Straße
Neubaugebiet Mühlengrund
Neubaugebiet Zingster Straße

Transport
The locality is served by tram lines M4, M5 and M17 of the Berlin tram network and by the S-Bahn stations of Hohenschönhausen (S75 line and Regionalbahn regional rail), Gehrenseestraße (S75) and Wartenberg (S75).

Photogallery

Literature
Walter Püschel: "Spaziergänge in Hohenschönhausen" - Haude & Spenersche Verlagsbuchhandlung GmbH, Berlin 1995.

References

External links

 Neu-Hohenschönhausen page on www.berlin.de

Localities of Berlin

Populated places established in the 13th century